The black-eared hemispingus (Sphenopsis melanotis) is a species of bird in the family Thraupidae.

It is found in humid highland forest in the Andes of western Venezuela, through to western Bolivia. It includes several distinctive subspecies, and two of these are sometimes considered as separate species: The western hemispingus (S. ochraceus) of the west Andean slope in southwestern Colombia and northwestern Ecuador, and the Piura hemispingus (S. piurae) of the west Andean slope in southwestern Ecuador and northwestern Peru.

References

black-eared hemispingus
Birds of the Northern Andes
black-eared hemispingus
black-eared hemispingus
Taxonomy articles created by Polbot